Katha is a genus of tiger moths in the family Erebidae. The genus was erected by Moore in 1878.

Most species were previously placed in the genus Eilema.

Species
 Katha conformis (Walker, 1854)
 Katha deplana (Esper, 1787)
 Katha laevis (Butler, 1877)
 Katha magnata (Matsumura, 1927)
 Katha moorei Leech, 1890
 Katha nankunshanica Dubatolov, Kishida & M. Wang, 2012
 Katha nigropoda (Bremer & Grey, 1852)
 Katha prabana (Moore, 1859)
 Katha rungsi (Toulgoët, 1960)
 Katha suffusa (Leech, 1899)

References

 

Lithosiina
Moth genera